The 1995 Individual Speedway Junior World Championship was the 19th edition of the World motorcycle speedway Under-21 Championships. The event was won by Jason Crump of Australia and he also gained qualification to 1996 Speedway Grand Prix.

World final
August 5, 1995
 Tampere, Ratinan Stadion

References

1995
World I J
Individual Speedway
Speedway competitions in Finland